Castelbianco is a comune (municipality) in the Province of Savona in the Italian region Liguria, located about  southwest of Genoa and about  southwest of Savona.

Castelbianco borders the following municipalities: Arnasco, Erli, Nasino, Onzo, Vendone, and Zuccarello.

References